The 1973–74 Football League season was Birmingham City Football Club's 71st in the Football League and their 40th in the First Division. After spending most of the season in the relegation positions, they finished in 19th place in the 22-team division, avoiding relegation by just one point. They entered the 1973–74 FA Cup at the third round proper and lost to Queens Park Rangers in the fourth, and were eliminated from the League Cup in the fifth round by Plymouth Argyle. They lost in the second round of the Texaco Cup on aggregate, after the first attempt to play the second leg of their match against Newcastle United had to be abandoned after 100 minutes when it became too dark to play.

Thirty players made at least one appearance in nationally organised first-team competition, and there were twelve different goalscorers. Forward Bob Hatton played in 51 of the 54 first-team matches over the season, and the leading goalscorer was Hatton with 20 goals, of which 14 came in league competition.

In February 1974, by which time he had already scored 18 goals for Birmingham, centre-forward Bob Latchford signed for Everton in part-exchange for Howard Kendall, Archie Styles, and £80,000. The whole package was valued at a British record transfer fee of £350,000.

Football League First Division

League table (part)

FA Cup

League Cup

Texaco Cup

The home leg of the quarter final match against Newcastle United finished as a 1–1 draw. Despite the ban on use of floodlights because of the fuel crisis, the League refused to allow an earlier kickoff time for the away leg on 28 November 1973. The match was abandoned at 1–1 after 10 minutes of extra time in almost total darkness. Keith Bowker scored Birmingham's goal, in his only appearance of the season and last outing for the club; neither appearance nor goal count towards his statistics. When the match was replayed, Birmingham lost 3–1 after Newcastle's Jimmy Smith was sent off in the first two minutes for a tackle that broke both bones in Tony Want's lower leg.

Appearances and goals

Numbers in parentheses denote appearances as substitute.
Players with name struck through and marked  left the club during the playing season.
Players with names in italics and marked * were on loan from another club for the whole of their season with Birmingham.

See also
Birmingham City F.C. seasons

References
General
 
 
 Source for match dates and results: 
 Source for lineups, appearances, goalscorers and attendances: Matthews (2010), Complete Record, pp. 382–83, 478–89.

Specific

Birmingham City F.C. seasons
Birmingham City